Taeniarchis catenata is a species of moth of the family Tortricidae. It is found in Australia, where it has been recorded from Queensland and New South Wales.

The forewings are ochreous whitish, strigulated (finely streaked) with brownish fuscous, which forms wavy transverse lines in the basal half of the wing and towards the apex. The hindwings are ochreous whitish, reticulated (a net-like pattern) with blackish towards the apex, termen and tornus.

References

Moths described in 1910
Cnephasiini